Menyanthes is a monotypic genus of flowering plants in the family Menyanthaceae containing the single species Menyanthes trifoliata. The North American form is often referred to as M. trifoliata var. minor Michx. It is known in English by the common names bogbean and buckbean.

Description
Menyanthes trifoliata has a horizontal rhizome with alternate, trifoliate leaves. The inflorescence is an erect raceme of white flowers.

The species occurs in fens and bogs in Asia, Europe, and North America. In eastern North America, it is considered to be a diagnostic fen species. It sometimes creates big quagmires with its thick roots.

Taxonomy
The name Menyanthes comes from the Greek words menyein, meaning "disclosing", and anthos, meaning "flower", in reference to the sequential opening of flowers on the inflorescence.

Fossil record 
One fossil seed of Menyanthes trifoliata has been extracted from borehole samples of the Middle Miocene fresh water deposits in Nowy Sacz Basin, West Carpathians, Poland.

Conservation
The species is protected in the United States.

Uses
The rootstock can be ground into an unpalatable flour for emergency use.
The plant has a characteristic strong and bitter taste, which can be used in schnapps.

In China, the plant is known as "Sleeping herbs 睡菜" or "Herbs that calm consciousness 暝菜". 

 Guangdong Xing Yu (1678), a Qing dynasty book by Chiu-Da-Jun, records: "Eat [Menyanthes trifoliata;] makes people sleep well."
 The Compendium of Materia Medica records: "[Treats] insomnia, restlessness".

References

External links

 
 
 Jepson Manual Treatment
 USDA Plants Profile
 Photo gallery

Plants used in traditional Chinese medicine
Menyanthaceae
Monotypic Asterales genera
Flora of Europe
Flora of North America
Flora of Asia